I'm a Celebrity: Extra Camp (known as I'm a Celebrity...Get Me Out of Here! Now! until 2015) was the companion series to I'm a Celebrity...Get Me Out of Here!, that was broadcast on ITV2 from August 2002 to December 2019. It features behind-the-scenes footage and interviews with contestants after they have been voted off by the public.

From the ninth to nineteenth series, the programme had been filmed completely live in Australia with occasional celebrity interviews based in London, shown through webcam.

In 2020, Extra Camp was replaced by I'm a Celebrity...The Daily Drop presented by Vick Hope which also airs on ITV2 after being uploaded online every weekday morning on ITV Hub but was axed in 2021.

History
In the first series, the show was presented by Irish TV presenter Louise Loughman. In series 2–3, the show was presented by Mark Durden-Smith and Tara Palmer-Tomkinson. In series 4, Palmer-Tomkinson was absent and Durden-Smith was the only host. For the fifth series, Palmer-Tomkinson returned to present the show. Durden-Smith did not, as he decided to spend time with his children instead. He was replaced by Matt Brown. Palmer-Tomkinson did not return for series 6.

In series 6, Brendon Burns initially presented the show, but left after three episodes. This led to Durden-Smith returning for the rest of the series, where he presented from the UK. He was joined by new presenters Kelly Osbourne and Jeff Brazier (briefly Steve Wilson before Brazier took over), who presented from the jungle in Australia. Also this series, a 5pm teatime programme, I'm a Celebrity...Get Me Out of Here! Exclusive, ran each weekday on the main ITV channel. It was co-hosted by series 5 runner-up Sheree Murphy and Phillip Schofield in 2006. It did not return for a second series.

For series 7–8, Matt Willis and his wife Emma took over from the previous hosts, Kelly Osbourne and Jeff Brazier, in Australia. Because they were having a child in early 2009, they did not return to present series 9. Durden-Smith also presented the show, from the UK, for the final time.

Series 9 to 10 saw new presenter Caroline Flack take over with roving reporter Joe Swash, email/people reporter Russell Kane, and a panel of celebrity pundits, which changed approximately every three to five days. For series 11, Flack left in order to present another ITV2 show, The Xtra Factor, and was replaced by Laura Whitmore. Swash and Kane both stayed on for the eleventh series.

For series 12, Russell Kane was replaced by stand-up comic Rob Beckett. All three presenters returned to present the thirteenth and fourteenth series of the show.

Due to tour commitments, Beckett did not return for Series 15. He was replaced by comedian David Morgan.

On 14 April 2016, Laura Whitmore stated that she would not be returning to the Jungle. On 31 May 2016 during an interview on Up Late with Rylan, Morgan confirmed that he would not be returning to the series due to other work commitments. They were replaced by Vicky Pattison, Stacey Solomon and Chris Ramsey.

On 13 April 2017, Pattison and Ramsey both stated on social media that they would not be returning to the show in 2017. It was confirmed that 2016 winner Scarlett Moffatt was announced as a new presenter in September 2017 and will join long-running presenter Joe Swash on the new series. It was also confirmed that Joel Dommett would join the presenting lineup. On 20 July 2019, it was confirmed that both Swash and Moffatt had left the show and would not return for the series that year. It was confirmed on 9 October that Emily Atack and Adam Thomas would join Dommett for the 2019 series.

On 9 January 2020, it was announced that series had been axed due to high production costs and would not return later that year. The series was replaced by online spin-off show I'm a Celebrity...The Daily Drop, hosted by Vick Hope on ITV Hub and repeated on ITV2. In October 2021, it was announced that the online spin-off show I'm a Celebrity...The Daily Drop had been axed, with no plans for a replacement.

Presenters
Various TV presenters and comedians have hosted the show since it began in 2002, with Joe Swash having presented the most series, at ten.

Notes

References

External links

2002 British television series debuts
2019 British television series endings
2000s British reality television series
2010s British reality television series
I'm a Celebrity...Get Me Out of Here! (British TV series)
English-language television shows
ITV reality television shows
Television series by ITV Studios
Television shows set in Australia